The 1999 Firestone Firehawk 500K was the second round of the 1999 CART FedEx Champ Car World Series season, held on April 9, 1999, on the Twin Ring Motegi in Motegi, Tochigi, Japan.

This was the first Champ Car race since the 1995 Indianapolis 500, in which Al Unser Jr. is absent on the starting grid.

Report

Race 
There was drama at the start when polesitter Gil de Ferran spun while taking the green flag. As a result, the start was delayed, and de Ferran was able to take back his starting position: pole. He led the early stages but then began to drop back with tire problems and Maurício Gugelmin took the lead. Gugelmin led comfortably until the first round of stops, when he overshot his pitlane, losing time. He was also given a black flag for running over pit equipment, which put him a lap down and out of contention. Adrián Fernández took the lead and led comfortably until Juan Pablo Montoya closed right up to him. Fernández held him off, and Montoya's challenge was ended when he lost three laps due to a fuel pick-up problem. In the final stages of the race, it seemed clear that everyone had to pit for fuel, and a caution brought out by Max Papis's spin was ideal. All the leaders pitted, except Fernández who for some reason stayed out. It seemed to be a mistake, as the race went green with 4 laps left, and he did not have enough fuel for 4 green-flag laps. However, Greg Moore, running second, spun while lapping backmarkers, which resulted in Richie Hearn crashing, and the caution came out again. Whereas the spin dropped Moore to fourth, the caution was till the end of the race, which meant that Fernández did not have to stop, and thus won the race. de Ferran recovered to finish second, and Christian Fittipaldi completed the podium.

Classification

Race

Caution flags

Lap Leaders

Point standings after race

References 

Firestone Firehawk 500K
Firestone Firehawk 500K